The Copa Lipton or Copa de Caridad Lipton was a football friendly competition contested between Argentina and Uruguay national teams. The competition was held 29 times between 1905 and 1992.

History

The trophy was donated by the Scottish tea magnate Thomas Lipton for a tournament between the two countries either side of the Río de La Plata with the condition that the teams be made up of only native born players. The trophy (the oldest international cup exhibited at the Argentine Association headquarters) was sculpted by English goldsmiths Flokington from Regent Street.

The tournament was contested on an annual basis between 1905 and 1929, with the exception of 1914, 1920–1921 and 1925–1926. It has only been played sporadically since, with only 9 editions played over half a century between 1937 and 1992. The decade of 1910 is considered "the golden age" of the competition, due to Argentina and Uruguay were the predominant teams in South America by then and the Copa Lipton was the most important competition for both sides. Nevertheless, the Cup lost interest since the 1930s because of the birth of FIFA World Cup, the conflicts between AFA and AUF and the inclusion of other nations in South American competitions.

The Copa Lipton has been contested 29 times in total, with Argentina the winners on 18 occasions and Uruguay on 11. In the event of a draw, the cup was traditionally awarded to the away team and the date and rules of the next tournament were set by the holders.

List of champions

Finals
The following list includes all editions of Copa Lipton:

Notes

Titles by country

All-time scorers
  José Piendibene 3
  Hector Scarone 3
  Carlos Scarone 3

Most finals by player
10:  Cayetano Saporiti (won 5)
9:  Angel Romano (won 6),  Juan Domingo Brown (won 5)
7:  Pablo Dacal (won 4),  Eliseo Brown (won 3) 
6:  José Piendibene (won 3),  Juan Enrique Hayes (won 2)  
5:  Jorge Brown (won 3),  Carlos Tomás Wilson (won 2),  Juan Carlos Bertone (won 2)
4:  Hector Scarone (won 3),  Carlos Scarone (won 2),  Alexander Watson Hutton (won 3),  Ernesto Brown (won 2),  Pedro Calomino (won 1)  
3:  Pedro Petrone (won 2),  Hector Castro (won 1)

See also
 Copa Newton
 Argentina–Uruguay football rivalry
 Sir Thomas Lipton Trophy
 Lipton Challenge Cup

References

l
l
l
l
l
l